Adílio de Oliveira Gonçalves (born 15 May 1956), usually known simply as Adílio, is a Brazilian former professional footballer who played as a midfielder. He made two appearances for the Brazil national team.

Club career
Born in Rio de Janeiro, he was a talented midfielder, who played for Flamengo between 1975 and 1987, during the most glorious years in the history of the Gávea club. During those years, he won virtually every competition he disputed: the Rio State Championship in 1978, 1979 (twice), 1981 and 1986; the Série A in 1980, 1982, 1983 and 1987; the 1981 Libertadores Cup, and the Intercontinental Cup, when he scored one of the goals of Flamengo's 3–0 victory against England's Liverpool. Adílio played 181 Série A games for Flamengo, scoring 26 goals, and played 11 Série A games for Coritiba, without scoring a goal.

Adílio also played for Coritiba in 1987 and 1988, Barcelona de Guayaquil of Ecuador, in 1989, Alianza Lima of Peru, in 1991 and 1992, and Borussia Fulda of Germany in 1996, besides some smaller clubs in Rio de Janeiro state, like América de Três Rios in 1994, Barreira in 1995 and in 1996, Friburguense in 1996 and Barra Mansa in 1997. He played for Itumbiara in 1991, Santos-ES in 1993, and Bacabal and Serrano in 1995.

Having played 611 matches for Flamengo, Adílio is the third player with most appearances for the club.

International career
Adílio played two games for the Brazil national team. The first game was played on 5 July 1979, against a Bahia state combined team, while the last game was played on 21 March 1982, against West Germany.

Managerial career
After retiring from playing, Adílio began to devote himself to coaching. His first experience was the front of Saudi Bahain, soon after, as Brown is affectionately called, took command of the CFZ, his companion of old Zico.

In 2003 the former player accepted an invitation from Flamengo to take command of the basic categories. Back in his crib, Adilio played an enviable job in front of the red and black boys. In four years in junior, he was champion in Rio, OPG Cup double champion, champion of the Rio-São Paulo and Belo Horizonte Cup, and placed third in the World Cup in Malaysia. Also helped form players of the caliber of Renato Augusto, Erick Flores, Thiago Sales, and midfielder Rômulo.

In this work period at Flamengo, Adilio had one that was perhaps its greatest opportunity in the coaching career when he was driven to take the senior team in 2006. The team that had remained wildly in Série A of 2005, thanks to the good offices of Joel Santana, had lost its commander and is now coached by Adílio. Experience, however, failed. The team played two matches Adílio and lost to both New Delhi and Cabofriense respectively. After this, the former player came back to coach the team base.

In 2008, after spending a season in white, Adilio was passed over the post and gave way to Rogério Lourenço.

References

External links

 Adílio at Flapédia 
 

1956 births
Living people
Footballers from Rio de Janeiro (city)
Brazilian footballers
Brazilian expatriate footballers
Brazil international footballers
CR Flamengo footballers
Coritiba Foot Ball Club players
Barcelona S.C. footballers
Itumbiara Esporte Clube players
Esporte Clube Internacional de Lages players
Club Alianza Lima footballers
Boavista Sport Club players
Friburguense Atlético Clube players
Campeonato Brasileiro Série A players
Expatriate footballers in Ecuador
Expatriate footballers in Peru
Expatriate footballers in Portugal
Centro de Futebol Zico managers
Association football midfielders
Brazilian football managers